The Warmadewa dynasty, also Varmadeva dynasty, was a regnal dynasty in the island of Bali.

History
There is little explicit information about how the various monarchs called Warmadewa were related to each other. The term "dynasty", in this context, therefore refers generally to a group of monarchs who share a common element in their titles, rather than a hereditary lineage.

It is believed that the dynasty was founded by Sri Kesari Warmadewa in the 10th century. However, the only evidence for this claim is that Sri Kesari is the first Balinese king to use the name Warmadewa, on the Belanjong pillar (B.13). There is no explicit evidence that Sri Kesari founded the Warmadewa dynasty, only that he is the earliest known member of it. Only the part Śri Kesarī Warma- of this name is clearly visible on the stone, but it is conjectured that the final element -dewa was written there but is now illegible.

The dynasty prospered for several generations. The final ruler to use the title Warmadewa was the famous king Udayana Warmadewa, in the Abang Pura Batur A inscription dated 6 April 1011.  Udayana Warmadewa is believed by many historians to be the father of Airlangga, the famous king of Java in the 1020s to 1040s, on the basis of Airlangga's biography given in the Pucangan inscription (1041).

Kings of the Warmadewa dynasty
 Sri Kesari Warmadewa (c. 914)
 Sang Ratu Ugrasena
 Tabanendra Warmadewa
 Indrajayasingha Warmadewa (c. 962)
 Janasadhu Warmadewa (c. 975)
 Udayana Warmadewa
 Airlangga (991-1049)
 Marakata Pangkaja
 Anak Wungsu (1049-)

See also
 Bali Kingdom
 History of Bali
 List of monarchs of Bali

Notes

References
 Willard A. Hanna (2004). Bali Chronicles. Periplus, Singapore. .

History of Bali
Monarchs of Bali
Indonesian families